Rashid Mian Anwar (12 April 1910 – 1983) was an Indian freestyle sport wrestler who competed in the 1936 Summer Olympics.

In 1936 he competed in the Freestyle welterweight tournament. At the 1934 Empire Games he won the bronze medal in the freestyle welterweight class. First Indian to win a medal at the British Empire Games/Commonwealth Games. He died at the age of 73 in Camden, Greater London.

External links

References

1910 births
1983 deaths
Olympic wrestlers of India
Wrestlers at the 1936 Summer Olympics
Indian male sport wrestlers
Wrestlers at the 1934 British Empire Games
Commonwealth Games bronze medallists for India
Commonwealth Games medallists in wrestling
20th-century Indian people
Medallists at the 1934 British Empire Games